The Directorate-General for Agriculture and Rural Development (DG AGRI) is a Directorate-General of the European Commission. The DG AGRI is responsible for the European Union policy area of agriculture and rural development. The work of the DG AGRI is closely linked with the Common Agricultural Policy (CAP).

The Director-General (since April 2020) is Wolfgang Burtscher, with Michael Scannell serving as Deputy DG. The European Commissioner for Agriculture and Rural Development in the von der Leyen Commission is Janusz Wojciechowski, who took office in December 2019. Its address is 130 Rue de la Loi, Brussels.

Mission 
The mission statement of DG Agri is closely linked to the Common Agricultural Policy (CAP).  The DG's current concrete concerns include :
 Managing and developing the CAP
 Reinforcing rural development policy as the "second pillar of the CAP"
 Safeguarding the European model of agriculture
 Conducting the enlargement process

Leadership and staff

The Directorate-General for Agriculture and Rural Development has a staff of about 1000 people.

Commissioner
The European Commissioner for Agriculture and Rural Development have been
Phil Hogan (2014–2019)
Janusz Wojciechowski (2019–)

Directors General 
José Manuel Silva Rodríguez (1999–2005)
Jean-Luc Demarty (2005–2010)
José Manuel Silva Rodríguez (2010–2013)
Jerzy Bogdan Plewa (2013–2019)
María Angeles Benítez Salas (2020, acting)
Wolfgang Burtscher (2020–)

Structure
The DG AGRI encompasses 12 Directorates, all headquartered in Brussels:
 A: International Affairs I, (in particular WTO negotiations)
 B: International Affairs II, (in particular enlargement)
 C: Economics of Agricultural Markets and single CMO
 D: Direct Support, Market Measures, Promotion
 E: Rural Development Programmes I
 F: Rural Development Programmes II (SAPARD)
 G: Horizontal Aspects of Rural Development
 H: Sustainability and quality of agriculture and rural development
 I: Internal Resource Management
 J: Audit of Agricultural Expenditure
 K: Relations with other Institutions; Communication and Documentation
 L: Economic Analyses, Perspectives and Evaluation
 M: Agricultural Legislation

See also
 European Commissioner for Agriculture
 Common Agricultural Policy
 Agriculture and Fisheries Council (Council of the European Union)
 Directorate-General for Agriculture, Fisheries, Social Affairs and Health
 European Parliament Committee on Agriculture and Rural Development

References

External links 
 Directorate General for Agriculture and Rural Development

Agriculture and Rural Development
European Union and agriculture
European Commission
European Commission
Rural development in Europe